Nihat Akbay (1 January 1945 – 24 March 2020) was a Turkish footballer who played as a goalkeeper.

Career
Born in Beykoz, Istanbul, Akbay played club football for Beykoz and Galatasaray.

He also earned 7 caps for the Turkish national team between 1964 and 1976.

Later life and death
Akbay died on 24 March 2020.

References

1945 births
2020 deaths
Turkish footballers
Beykozspor footballers
Galatasaray S.K. footballers
Süper Lig players
TFF First League players
Association football goalkeepers
Turkey international footballers